The 2015 Grand Prix de Dottignies was a one-day women's cycle race held in Belgium on 6 April 2015. The race was given a rating of 1.2 by the Union Cycliste Internationale (UCI), and was won by France's Roxane Fournier.

Results

See also
 2015 in women's road cycling

References

Grand Prix de Dottignies
Grand Prix de Dottignies
Women's road bicycle races
Grand Prix de Dottignies